This article lists political parties in the United States Virgin Islands.
The United States Virgin Islands has a three-party system, and many additional candidates run as independents.

The parties

Democratic Party of the Virgin Islands
Independent Citizens Movement (ICM)
Republican Party of the Virgin Islands
Green Party of the United States Virgin Islands

Former parties
 Unity Party

See also
 Politics of the United States Virgin Islands
 List of political parties by country
Political party strength in the United States Virgin Islands

External links
http://www.vivote.gov/

U.S. Virgin Islands
 
+Virgin Islands
United States Virgin Islands
Political parties